On February 11, 1996,  of the Le Soir d'Algérie newspaper in Algiers. 29 people, including three journalists, were killed by the terrorists.

Events 
The offices of three other newspapers in the same building were damaged.

Aftermath 
In the days that followed the bombing, the journalists for Le Soir d'Algerie worked in the office of El Watan. Encouraged by other journalists and the Algerian media, Le Soir d'Algérie published a new issue on 25 February and moved its office to another building, which was inaugurated by Ahmed Ouyahia.

See also 

 Charlie Hebdo massacre

References 

Car and truck bombings in Algeria
Car and truck bombings in the 1990s
Improvised explosive device bombings in 1996
Attacks on mass media offices
Building bombings in Africa
Attacks on buildings and structures in Algeria
20th century in Algiers
Crime in Algiers
February 1996 crimes
February 1996 events in Africa
Algerian Civil War
1996 murders in Algeria
Terrorist incidents in Algeria in 1995
Mass murder in 1996
20th-century mass murder in Africa